Once Upon A Time is the fourth studio album by Liverpool Express, released in August 2003.

Notable tracks from this album are the title song, "Once Upon A Time", which harks back to the group's hit "Every Man Must Have A Dream", and "Sailin' Down to Rio", the band's ode to Rio de Janeiro, a city they fell in love with during their tour of Brazil in the late 1970s.

A new version of "John George Ringo & Paul" was included on this album. The song was first heard on The Best of Liverpool Express the year before.

Ian Bairnson, the guitarist with The Alan Parsons Project and Pilot, plays on two tracks, "Once Upon a Time" and "Find My Way Back Home".

Track listing

"Chinatown" (Billy Kinsley, Kenny Parry)
"Out of the Blue" (Billy Kinsley)
"Once Upon A Time" (Roger Scott Craig, Billy Kinsley)
"The End of the Game" (Roger Scott Craig, Billy Kinsley)
"Best Years of My Life" (Billy Kinsley)
"John George Ringo & Paul" (Roger Scott Craig)
"This Door Is Always Open" (Roger Scott Craig, Billy Kinsley)
"Tomorrow Is Another Day" (Roger Scott Craig, Billy Kinsley)
"Sailin' Down To Rio" (Roger Scott Craig, Billy Kinsley)
"Find My Way Back Home" (Roger Scott Craig, Billy Kinsley)
"Wherever You Are" (Billy Kinsley)
"The Worst Band in the World" (Billy Kinsley, Frankie Connor, Alan Crowley)

Personnel
Liverpool Express
Billy Kinsley – lead, harmony and backing vocals, bass guitar, acoustic guitar
Kenny Parry – harmony, and backing vocals, rhythm guitar, lead guitar, harmonica
Roger Scott Craig – harmony and backing vocals, keyboards
Dave Goldberg – harmony and backing vocals

Additional musicians
Mike Turner – rhythm guitar, lead guitar
Billy Leisegang – lead guitar

Guest musician
Ian Bairnson – lead guitar ("Find My Way Back Home" & "Once Upon A Time")

External links
Liverpool Express  official website

2003 albums
Liverpool Express albums